Saskia Loretta van Erven García (born August 29, 1987 in Rotterdam, Netherlands) is a Dutch-Colombian female fencer. At the 2012 Summer Olympics she competed in the Women's foil, and was defeated 9-14 in the second round by Carolin Golubytskyi.  She was also defeated in the second round of the 2016 Olympics, by Aida Mohamed, 15-12.

Van Erven García studies journalism at a university in Amsterdam, while she trains fencing at SchermCentrum Amsterdam. Although she was born and raised in the Netherlands, she changed her fencing nationality to her mother's country Colombia in 2011, and represented Colombia at the 2012 Summer Olympics. Van Erven García's mother comes from Cali, Colombia.

She took up fencing at the age of 6 because her parents were involved in the sport.  Indeed her mother, Gloria Garcia Pacheco, also represented Colombia internationally, winning a gold medal in the team foil at the 1971 Pan-American Games.

She represented Colombia at the 2020 Summer Olympics.

References

1987 births
Living people
Dutch people of Colombian descent
Colombian female foil fencers
Dutch female foil fencers
Fencers at the 2012 Summer Olympics
Fencers at the 2016 Summer Olympics
Olympic fencers of Colombia
Sportspeople from Rotterdam
University of Amsterdam alumni
Fencers at the 2015 Pan American Games
Pan American Games medalists in fencing
Pan American Games silver medalists for Colombia
Competitors at the 2018 Central American and Caribbean Games
Central American and Caribbean Games gold medalists for Colombia
Central American and Caribbean Games medalists in fencing
Medalists at the 2015 Pan American Games
Fencers at the 2020 Summer Olympics
21st-century Colombian women
21st-century Dutch women